Toy Story Toons is an American computer-animated series of short films based on the Toy Story franchise. The storylines of the series begin after Toy Story 3. The films are set at Bonnie's house, the new home of Andy's toys. Three shorts were released as part of the series, Hawaiian Vacation and Small Fry in 2011 and Partysaurus Rex in 2012. The shorts were shown during the theatrical releases of Walt Disney Pictures films.

Cast and characters

Episodes

References

External links

Film series introduced in 2011
Pixar short films
Toy Story
Animated short film series
Disney short film series
2011 American television series debuts
2012 American television series endings
2010s American animated television series
American children's animated comedy television series
American computer-animated television series
Animated television shows based on films
Disney Channel original programming
Disney Junior original programming
Sentient toys in fiction